Flagler Beach is a city in Flagler County in the U.S. state of Florida.  The population was 4,484 at the 2010 census.

Flagler Beach is part of the Deltona–Daytona Beach–Ormond Beach, FL metropolitan statistical area. It is named for oil tycoon and Florida railroad developer Henry Flagler, who was a key figure in the development of East Florida as resort and vacation destinations.

Geography

The Ocean Palm Villas South subdivision east of the Intracoastal Waterway is the only portion of Flagler Beach in Volusia County.

Florida State Road A1A travels through Flagler Beach along an approximate north-south axis. The road suffered significant damage during Hurricane Matthew, due to coastal erosion facilitated by a storm surge.

Demographics

As of the census of 2000, there were 4,954 people, 2,535 households, and 1,493 families residing in the city. The population density was 519.8/km2 (1,345.1/mi2). There were 3,224 housing units at an average density of 338.3/km2 (875.4/mi2). The racial makeup of the city was 97.86% White, 0.52% Black, 0.22% American Indian, 0.57% Asian, 0.02% Pacific Islander, 0.14% from other races, and 0.67% from two or more races. Latino or Latino of any race were 1.84% of the population.

There were 2,535 households, out of which 12.9% had children under the age of 18 living with them, 50.6% were married couples living together, 6.5% had a female householder with no husband present, and 41.1% were non-families. 33.8% of all households were made up of individuals, and 16.9% had someone living alone who was 65 years of age or older. The average household size was 1.95 and the average family size was 2.43.

In the city, the population was spread out, with 11.5% under the age of 18, 4.4% from 18 to 24, 20.0% from 25 to 44, 32.5% from 45 to 64, and 31.5% who were 65 years of age or older. The median age was 53 years. For every 100 females, there were 92.8 males. For every 100 females age 18 and over, there were 91.2 males.

The median income for a household in the city was $37,917, and the median income for a family was $47,073. Males had a median income of $31,848 versus $30,132 for females. The per capita income for the city was $24,600. About 9.0% of families and 10.9% of the population were below the poverty line, including 18.4% of those under age 18 and 10.4% of those age 65 or over.

Attractions

America's Coolest Small Town finalist
Flagler Beach was a finalist in the 2013 Budget Travel Magazine contest for "Coolest Small Town". The magazine described it by the following:

Twenty miles north of Daytona Beach on A1A, Flagler Beach couldn't be more different from its party-hardy neighbor to the south. In fact, the area seems to attract more sea turtles and right whales than spring breakers. And it's not hard to see why: This thin strip of a beach town, between the Atlantic Ocean and the Intracoastal Waterway, has remained significantly less developed than its neighbors. The six miles of pristine sand—which boast an orange hue thanks to crushed coquina shells—are only interrupted by one fishing pier. In town, the vibe is laid back and retro, thanks to spots like Grampa's Uke Joint, which sells ukuleles, and High Tides at Snack Jack, a 1950s fish shack that attracts surfers with funky dishes like tuna reubens, ahi club sandwiches, and sake Bloody Marys.

Retirement location
Flagler Beach was ranked by Where to Retire magazine as one of the top retirement destinations in Florida. It was featured in the November–December 2012 issue.

Flagler Beach Historical Museum

The Flagler Beach Historical Museum's permanent collection is entirely dedicated to Florida history, featuring Flagler Beach and Flagler County. The collection ranges from prehistoric bones and other remains of the Stone Age to a "Space Age" side. The latter has an exhibit with items provided by NASA astronauts, including space food and the Flagler Beach city flag, which was sent to orbit the earth aboard the Space Shuttle Endeavour.

Orange Period pottery pieces from indigenous peoples of the region date from 2000 BCE to 500 CE Historic Native American Indian life is represented by an exhibit of arrowheads and other artifacts, all discovered in Flagler County.

The Florida territory had changing European rulers in the war years between the 1500s and the early 1800s: Spanish, English and American. Mill and plantation artifacts make up the display about the Plantation Period. Personal use items, such as buttons and bottles obtained from area missions, represent the history of individuals in the area. From the Mala Compra Plantation, burned down during the Second Seminole War, the Museum has items from the early 19th-century home of Joseph Hernandez, who was elected as the first Hispanic congressman in the U.S.

The period of the late 1800s and early 1900s are represented by books and exhibits about the area's economy: county farming of cabbage and potatoes, timber industry, railroad artifacts, and turpentine camp items. Exhibits also include documents and memorabilia associated with the 20th-century development boom that began in the western portion of Flagler County and was continued oceanside. Displays feature four Flagler Beach "first families" who purchased land and built what was once considered a seaside resort.

Other display items from the early 1900s include memorabilia from early city government, the county's Old Brick Road, the Flagler Beach Hotel, World War II items, the A1A highway, Marineland, and early advertising brochures. Representations of local organizations from 1925 forward are represented in displays featuring the Flagler Beach Fire Department, Boy Scouts of Flagler, and Flagler Beach schools.

Fire department
The Flagler Beach Fire Department was established in 1926 by the Town of Flagler Beach's Commission. Currently, Flagler Beach has a population of roughly 5,500 year-round residents, and its fire department responds to approximately 1,500 calls a year. The City of Flagler Beach is served by a full-time professional staff of 16 fire department employees on duty 24 hours a day, 7 days a week, to provide an immediate response 365 days a year.

References

External links

 City of Flagler Beach official website
 Flagler Beach Historical Museum
 Flagler County / Flagler Beach Tourism Office
 Flagler Beach Webcam and Surf Report

Populated coastal places in Florida on the Atlantic Ocean
Cities in Flagler County, Florida
Cities in Volusia County, Florida
Populated places established in 1925
Cities in Florida
Beaches of Flagler County, Florida
Beaches of Volusia County, Florida
Beaches of Florida